Tea Gardens is a locality in the Mid-Coast Council local government area, located near the southern extremity of the Mid North Coast and the northern extremity of the Hunter Region in New South Wales, Australia.

At the  Tea Gardens had a population of 2,884, with most of the population resident in the town of Tea Gardens at the southern end of the locality.

Geography
In the west it reaches the Pacific Highway. The town of Tea Gardens is located at the southernmost end of the locality, on the northern shore of Port Stephens on the west bank of the Myall River, which connects the Myall Lakes to the port. It is located directly across the river from Hawks Nest and the two lane Singing Bridge connects the two.

Demographics
According to the  the population of Tea Gardens is 2,884, an increase from 2,434 in 2011. The median age in Tea Gardens is 65, significantly higher than the national average of 38. Tea Gardens has one of the oldest populations in Australia. This is also an increase from 61 in 2011. 15.6% of residents are aged 65–69; this compares with the national figure of 5.1%. 4.2% of residents are Aboriginal or Torres Strait Islander; the median age among this group is 27.

79.2% of residents report being born in Australia; higher than the national average of 66.7%. Other than Australia the top countries are England (6.0%); New Zealand (1.6%), and Scotland (1.0%). The most common reported ancestries in Tea Gardens are English, Australian and Irish. 66.8% of residents report both parents being born in Australia, higher than the national average of 47.3%.

The major religious groups in Tea Gardens are Anglican 34.9%, Catholic 21.4% and Uniting Church 6.8%. 18.9% reported no religion with 7.1% not answering the question.

The unemployment rate in Tea Gardens is 8.3% as at the 2016 census, which is higher than the national average of 5%.

References

 
 1:100000 map 9332 Port Stephens

Towns in the Hunter Region
Suburbs of Mid-Coast Council